The Díaz-Balart family is a Cuban-American political family primarily composed of the descendants of Cuban politician Rafael Díaz-Balart, and including two members of the United States Congress. In 2003, the family was voted "Best Power Family" in the annual Miami New Times "BEST OF MIAMI" issue, which asserted that the family managed to "carve out a new U.S. Congressional district expressly for an ambitious family member", and also claimed that the father and grandfather of the U.S. politicians "were important members of the ruling oligarchy during the fearsome reign of Fulgencio Batista".

Members
Members of the family include:

Rafael José Díaz-Balart (c. 1899 – 1985), Cuban politician and mayor of the town of Banes; with his wife América Gutiérrez had two sons and a daughter:
Rafael Díaz-Balart (January 17, 1926 – May 6, 2005), Cuban politician; with his wife, Hilda Caballero Brunet, Díaz-Balart had four sons:
Rafael J. Díaz-Balart (born 1951), banker.
Lincoln Díaz-Balart (born August 13, 1954), U.S. Representative; with his wife, Cristina Fernandez, Díaz-Balart had two sons:
Lincoln Díaz-Balart Jr. (? – May 19, 2013)
Daniel Díaz-Balart
José Díaz-Balart (born November 7, 1960), television news anchor; with his wife, Brenda, Díaz-Balart has two daughters:
Katrina Díaz-Balart
Sabrina Díaz-Balart
Mario Díaz-Balart (born September 25, 1961),  U.S. Representative; with his wife, Tia Díaz-Balart, Díaz-Balart has one son:
Cristian Díaz-Balart
Mirta Díaz-Balart (born 30 September 1928), sister of Rafael, was the first wife of Cuban leader Fidel Castro; they had one son and then divorced prior to the Cuban Revolution; she then remarried, to Emilio Núñez Blanco, with whom she had two daughters:
With Fidel Castro:
Fidel Castro Díaz-Balart ("Fidelito"; September 1, 1949 – February 1, 2018), Cuban physicist; Fidel Castro's first-born son. With his former wife Natasha Smirnova, he had three children:
Mirta María Castro-Smirnova (born 1984), lives in Spain, and teaches applied mathematics at the University of Seville;
Fidel Antonio Castro-Smirnov (born 1980), became a specialist in biochemistry and molecular biology.
José Raúl Castro-Smirnov (born 1985), studied nanotechnology at the University of Barcelona, graduated the Higher Institute of Technologies and Applied Sciences in Havana, and University of Seville with a physicist's diploma.
With Emilio Núñez Blanco:
Mirta Núñez Díaz-Balart.
América Silvia Núñez Díaz-Balart.
Waldo Díaz-Balart (born February 10, 1931), brother of Rafael and Mirta, Cuban painter.

References

 
Political families of the United States
American people of Cuban descent